Segesd is a village in Somogy county, Hungary.

Culture
The Hungarian folk song Már megjöttünk estére was collected in 1933 in Segesd by Vilmos Seemayer.

External links 
 Street map (Hungarian)

References 

Populated places in Somogy County